"Bag of Money" is a song by American rapper Wale, featuring T-Pain and Wale's fellow Maybach Music Group labelmates Rick Ross and Meek Mill. It peaked at number 64 on the Billboard Hot 100, number 3 on the Hot Rap Songs chart, and number 2 on the Hot R&B/Hip-Hop Songs chart.

Critical reception
Ian Cohen of Pitchfork Media said "as far as "My bitch bad, lookin' like a bag of money" (the hook from "Bag of Money", natch) goes, I don't think women like being compared to formless sacks, but Ross really likes money, so a compliment's a compliment".

Remix
There are two versions of the remix; The main remix and the extended remix. The original remix features the original guests Rick Ross & T-Pain (Meek Mill's verse is omitted), Omarion, Lil Wayne, Yo Gotti, French Montana, Black Cobain & Trina (only background vocals), The extended remix features the guests that are in the main remix but features extra verses from Tyga, Trina (only had background vocals on the main remix), Rockie Fresh & an extended Yo Gotti, French Montana & Black Cobain verses. This remix clocks in at exactly 9 minutes.

Charts

Weekly charts

Year-end charts

References

2012 songs
2012 singles
Wale (rapper) songs
Rick Ross songs
T-Pain songs
Meek Mill songs
Music videos directed by Colin Tilley
Songs written by Meek Mill
Songs written by T.I.
Songs written by Rick Ross
Songs written by Wale (rapper)